St. Paul's Secondary School is a mixed day and boarding school located in Lweza, Kajjansi, in Uganda's Central Region.

Operations
The school offers both O level and A level education.

Fully registered and equipped, the school has UNEB centres for both O and A level for students to sit their examinations.

The school teaches all subjects, including in the arts and sciences, as recommended by the Ministry of Education and Sports hand in hand with the national curriculum development centre of the country.

See also

 Education in Uganda
 List of schools in Uganda

References

External links
 , the school's official website

Educational institutions with year of establishment missing
Boarding schools in Uganda
Co-educational boarding schools
Mixed schools in Uganda
Secondary schools in Uganda
Ssabagabo
Wakiso District